Rowland Vaughan may refer to:

 Rowland Vaughan (1559–1629), an English lord
Rowland Vaughan (poet) (died 1667), Welsh poet and translator
Rowland Vaughan (MP) (died 1566), MP for Breconshire and Brecon